Pabneukirchen is a municipality in the district of Perg in the Austrian state of Upper Austria.

Geography
Pabneukirchen lies in the Mühlviertel. About 37 percent of the municipality is forest, and 58 percent is farmland.

Population

References

Cities and towns in Perg District